Narmada (died 4 December 2012) was one of the "senior-most" female cadres of the Communist Party of India (Maoist), a banned Maoist insurgent communist party in India. She was a Central Committee member of the party, and reportedly used to frame "all policies for the female cadre of Maoists."

Family 
She married Sudhakar alias "Kiran". B. Sudhakar is seen as a Maoist ideologue, and is a member of CPI (Maoist)'s "publication division". He is also a member of the Politburo of the party.

Guerrilla life 
Narmada was able to fluently communicate in seven languages, including English. She dropped-out the college and joined the CPI (Maoist) at an early age of 18, and she had spent over 30 years in the jungles as a veteran to the Maoist movement in India. Her father was also a supporter of the communist ideology, and his words so touched her that she made her mind to join the radical leftists.

During an interview with Rahul Pandita and Vanessa (a French journalist), at an unknown time in the jungles of Dandakaranya, Narmada said:

And, it was after that conversation with her father, that she decided to join the Maoists. She was active as the Divisional Secretary of South Gadchiroli division of CPI (Maoist). She was the second female comrade to have been selected as a member of the Central Committee of the radical leftist organisation, after Anuradha Ghandy (wife of Kobad Ghandy). She was also acting as the chief of the Krantikari Adivasi Mahila Sangathan's unit of Dandakaranya region, which is among the top-most "women's organizations" in India when it comes to numbers of registered members, and Arundhati Roy says that it has 90,000 members. She had as much as 53 police cases registered against her name in Maharashtra.

Death 
Narmada was reported to have been gunned-down during a fierce hour-long exchange of fire between the Maoists and State's police forces on 4 December 2012, near Hiker village, bordering Abujmarh of Chhattisgarh, in south Gadchiroli.

The Maoists managed to escape the scene along with her body; and her body is reported to have been buried at Malwada tribal village in Kanker district of Chhattisgarh.

After the encounter, the Superintendent of Police (Gadchiroli), Mohd. Suvej Haq, said to media personnels: 

She is reported to have been 57 years old when she died, by The Hindu, but Hindustan Times reports that she was 46. And, Rahul Pandita has written that Narmada's age was 48, when he and Vanessa interviewed her.

While the "police sources" also say that "Narmada Akka's funeral was carried out at a village in Chhattisgarh", the Maoists did not reach out to the media following the incident.

See also 

 Socialism
 Communism
 Marxism
 Leninism
 Marxism-Leninism-Maoism
 People's war
 New Democratic Revolution
 Radicalism (historical)
 Left-wing politics
 Naxalite-Maoist insurgency
 Anand
 Anuradha Ghandy
 Azad
 Charu Majumdar
 Ganapathy
 Kishenji
 Kobad Ghandy
 Kondapalli Seetharamaiah
 Kosa
 Prashant Bose

External links 
 International Campaign Against War on the People in India
 The French journalist, Vanessa's conversation with Narmada and several other Comrades, OPEN

References 

2012 deaths
Anti-revisionists
Deaths by firearm in India
Indian guerrillas
Naxalite–Maoist insurgency
Communist Party of India (Maoist) politicians
Women in Andhra Pradesh politics
Year of birth missing
Indian women in war
Women in 20th-century warfare
20th-century Indian women politicians
20th-century Indian politicians
Adivasi politicians
Adivasi women
People from Gadchiroli district
People shot dead by law enforcement officers in India